Bryophryne is a genus of frogs in the family Strabomantidae. These frogs are endemic to south-eastern Peru in the Cusco Region, with an undescribed species from the Puno Region. Their range is separated from that of Phrynopus by the Apurímac River valley.

Taxonomy
The genus Bryophryne was erected in 2008 to accommodate two species that were in Phrynopus at that time; subfamily Holoadeninae was erected at the same time and placed in Strabomantidae.

Description
Head is narrower than the body. Differentiated tympanic membrane, tympanic annulus, columella, and cavum tympanicum are absent. Dorsum is finely areolate whereas venter is coarsely areolate.

Species
The following species are recognised in the genus Bryophryne:

Three species from southern Peru, formerly classified in the genus Bryophryne,  were re-assigned to a new genus Qosqophryne after a phylogenetic analysis determined that the genus Qosqophryne was sister to the genus Microkayla and that this clade was more closely related to Noblella and Psychrophrynella than to other species in the genus Bryophryne.

References

 
Strabomantidae
Amphibians of South America
Endemic fauna of Peru
Amphibian genera
Taxa named by William Edward Duellman
Taxa named by Stephen Blair Hedges